Yash Birla Group is Indian industrial conglomerate group based in Mumbai, Maharashtra. Its chairman Yashovardhan Birla, is a member of the Birla family. The group has diversified interest in industries like steel pipes, machine tools, cutting tools, tool holders, iron castings, power solution products, multipurpose engines pumps, electrical appliances, textiles, carpets, furnishing, lifestyle, infotech, publication, travel, electricity, property development, cotton ginning etc.
The Group traces its origins to the businesses started by various members of the Birla family.
The group today has 10 publicly listed subsidiaries in India.
The group is currently facing major financial and legal bottlenecks.

In June 2013, the group was declared a NPA account for non payment of dues. Further in 2016, UCO Bank also published a notice indicating Birla as defaulter. On 16 June 2019, he was declared wilful defaulter by the bank with outstanding dues of over 67 crores.`

Subsidiaries
Zenith Birla (India) Ltd: Zenith Birla (India) Limited was incorporated in 1960, and commenced its commercial production in 1962. ZBIL, a flagship company of Yash Birla Group, is a pioneer in Manufacture and Exports of Steel Pipes, Tubes, and Hollow Sections from India. The Company's plants are located at Khopoli, Tarapur & Murbad. The Khopoli Plant has a complete Manufacturing and Residential complex for its employees with facilities of School, Club House, Guest House, Temple and Auditorium.

 Birla Pacific Medspa -Bse India -stock trading was suspended due to non-compliance from June 2015.
 Birla Power
 Birla Infrasolutions Ltd
 Birla Precision Technologies Limited
 Birla Transasia Carpets Ltd,
 Birla Perucchini Ltd,
 Birla Electricals Ltd
 Birla Lifestyle Ltd,
 Birla Concepts (India) Pvt. Ltd
 Birla Shloka Infotech Ltd,
 Birla Cotsyn (India) Ltd
 Melstar Information Technologies

Logo
The logo of group is a conch.

See also
 Aditya Birla Group
 CK Birla Group
 Birla Family

References

 
Rajasthani people
Conglomerate companies of India
Companies based in Mumbai
Indian companies established in 1980
1980 establishments in India
Companies listed on the Bombay Stock Exchange